Rachel Ruysch (3 June 1664 – 12 October 1750) was a Dutch still-life painter from the Northern Netherlands. She specialized in flowers, inventing her own style and achieving international fame in her lifetime. Due to a long and successful career that spanned over six decades, she became the best documented woman painter of the Dutch Golden Age.

Personal life and career

Rachel Ruysch was born on 3 June 1664 in The Hague to the scientist Frederik Ruysch and Maria Post, the daughter of the architect Pieter Post. Her father was also a professor of anatomy and botany and an amateur painter. He had a vast collection of animal skeletons, and mineral and botany samples which Rachel used to practice her drawing skills. At a young age she began to paint the flowers and insects of her father's collection in the popular manner of Otto Marseus van Schrieck. Working from these samples Rachel matched her father's ability to depict nature with great accuracy. Later, as Rachel became more accomplished, she taught her father (and also her sister, Anna Ruysch) how to paint.

In 1679, at age fifteen, Ruysch was apprenticed to Willem van Aelst, a prominent flower painter in Amsterdam. His studio in Amsterdam looked out over the studio of the flower painter Maria van Oosterwijck. Ruysch studied with van Aelst until his death in 1683. Besides painting technique he taught her how to arrange a bouquet in a vase so it would look spontaneous and less formalized. This technique produced a more realistic and three-dimensional effect in her paintings. By the time Ruysch was eighteen she was producing and selling independently signed works. She would also have known and consorted with the flower painters Jan and Maria Moninckx, Alida Withoos, and Johanna Helena Herolt-Graff, who all were about her age and who worked for the hortus owner Agnes Block and who, like her father, also worked with the plant collectors Jan and Caspar Commelin.

In 1693 she married the Amsterdam portrait painter Juriaen Pool, with whom she had ten children. Throughout her marriage and adult life she continued to paint and produce commissions for an international circle of patrons. Other women at this time were expected to participate in art forms more traditionally practiced by women, such as sewing and spinning. Ruysch continued working as a painter after she married, mostly likely because her contribution to the family's income allowed them to hire help to care for their children.

Ruysch died in Amsterdam on 12 October 1750. After her death, despite changing attitudes about flower paintings, Ruysch has maintained a strong reputation.

Works

It is unknown whether Ruysch was a member of the Amsterdam Guild of Saint Luke, but early signed works by her in the 1680s show the influence of Otto Marseus van Schrieck. By 1699 she and her family had moved to The Hague, where she was offered membership in the Confrerie Pictura as their first female member. In 1701 she and her husband became members of The Hague Painter's Guild. In 1708, Ruysch was invited to work for the court in Düsseldorf and serve as court painter to Johann Wilhelm, Elector Palatine. She obtained a contract for works painted at home that she periodically brought to Düsseldorf. She continued working for him and his wife from 1708 until the prince's death in 1716.

Art historians consider Ruysch to be one of the most talented still life artists of either sex. By the time of her death at age 86 she had produced hundreds of paintings, of which more than 250 have been documented or are attributed to her.
Her dated works establish that she painted from the age of 15 until she was 83, a few years before her death. Historians are able to establish this with certainty because she included her age when signing her paintings.

Style
Ruysch had a very good understanding of drawing and the techniques of earlier traditions. This knowledge improved her painting abilities. Stylistically, her artwork, with its playful composition and brilliant colors, was part of the rococo movement. She paid extensive attention to all details in her work. Every petal was created painstakingly with delicate brushwork. The background of Ruysch's paintings are usually dark which was the fashion for flower painting in the second half of the 17th century. Her asymmetrical compositions with drooping flowers and wild stems created paintings that seemed to possess a great energy about them.

In her early work Ruysch painted a large number of forest floor pictures that feature small animals, reptiles, butterflies, and fungi. She later adopted flower painting as her main concern and continued to paint until her death, thus continuing the 17th-century style right down to the middle of the following century.

Ruysch's skill lay in the minute observation of each flower in an extremely naturalistic way, composed into an elaborate arrangement that would be very difficult to achieve in nature – the flowers would not support each other so well under such an arrangement. In common with most flower pieces from the last third of the 17th century, the colours of the flowers are much more carefully balanced than in the earlier pictures.

The symbolism of each flower was elaborately developed in the 17th century, but most of this concerned the introduction of a single flower into a Vanitas piece. Apart from Jan van Huysum, no 18th-century flower painter matched the skill of Rachel Ruysch.

Reception
Ruysch enjoyed great fame and reputation in her lifetime. When she died in 1750, eleven poets paid her their respects with poems about her. In the 17th century the Dutch were very interested in flowers and gardening, so paintings that highlighted the beauty of nature were highly valued. This helped to build and maintain Ruysch's clientele throughout her career. In her lifetime her paintings were sold for prices as high as 750–1200 guilders. In comparison, Rembrandt rarely received more than 500 guilders for a painting in his lifetime.

In 1999 a painting by Ruysch was discovered in a farmhouse in Normandy and was sold at auction for 2.9 million French francs, about US$508,000.

In March 2021, Ruysch's work was added to the "Gallery of Honour" at the Rijksmuseum. Ruysch, Gesina ter Borch, and Judith Leyster are the first women to be included in the gallery.

Gallery

References

External links
 
 
 Old Masters: Overlooked Women Artists
 Works and literature on Rachel Ruysch at PubHist
 Flowers in an Urn Zoomable at google

 
1664 births
1750 deaths
18th-century Dutch painters
18th-century Dutch women artists
Painters from Amsterdam
Artists from The Hague
Court painters
Dutch still life painters
Dutch women painters
Flower artists
Painters from The Hague
Sibling artists